New England College (NEC) is a private liberal arts college in Henniker, New Hampshire. As of Fall 2020 New England College's enrollment was 4,327 students (1,776 undergraduate and 2,551 graduate). The college is regionally accredited by the New England Commission of Higher Education.

History
Founded in 1946, New England College was established to serve the needs of servicemen and women attending college on the G.I. Bill after World War II. In 1970, the college purchased the Tortington Park School for Girls in Arundel, in the English county of West Sussex. For a time, the school functioned as an extension campus for NEC students wishing to study abroad; at one point, the college even changed its logo to incorporate the flags of both countries. However, the Arundel campus closed in 1998. For many years, the Theatre Department sent a group of students over to the British campus during the January term and spring term to prepare three shows for touring in England, Scotland, Wales, and sometimes elsewhere in Europe. This was a model program that combined study abroad with practical theatre experience.

Campus
The Contoocook River runs through the center of town and alongside the NEC campus.

The  campus, which has no distinct borders separating it from the town of Henniker, features 30 buildings, many of which feature white clapboard-style siding or brick mid-century architecture. The campus is known throughout New England for promoting environmental education initiatives. Pats Peak ski resort lies just outside the village center, and many students participate in outdoor activities such as skiing, snowboarding, whitewater rafting, hiking in the White Mountains, and rock-climbing.

Academics

New England College offers 9 associate degree programs, 37 bachelor's degree programs, 12 master's degree programs, and one doctoral degree program. The programs are divided into four divisions: the School of Arts & Sciences, the School of Education, the School of Management, and the School of Natural & Social Sciences. The college is accredited by the New England Commission of Higher Education, and all programs offered by New England College are included in this regional accreditation. Additionally, the school's Teacher Education Program (as well as the majors in Physical Education, Special Education, Elementary Education, and Secondary Education) are approved by the New Hampshire Department of Education. Currently, the school employs 40 full-time faculty members and holds a 14:1 student-to-faculty ratio.

The college's business degree programs have received "Candidate for Accreditation" Status by the Accreditation Council for Business Schools and Programs (ACBSP), which is one of three non-profit business school accrediting agencies recognized by CHEA (Council on Higher Education Accreditation).

Rankings

U.S. News & World Report ranks New England College #131-#171 in "Regional Universities - North, Tier 2." New England College ranks tied for 173 on the U.S. News & World Report list for "Best Online Bachelor's Programs" and ranks tied for 86 on the U.S. News & World Report list for Best Online Bachelor's Programs for Veterans.

Student life

The college is home to 27 student organizations, including various student government committees and Kappa Delta Phi NAS. There were originally five chapters of Greek life: two sororities (Kappa Phi Sigma and Phi Sigma Sigma) and three fraternities (Sigma Phi Delta, Lambda Epsilon Delta, and Sigma Alpha Beta), but those dissolved beginning in the late 2000s. Students also publish an award-winning campus newspaper called The New Englander and operate a campus-based radio station, WNEC-FM.

New England College opened an esports arena in January 2019. This club sport at NEC is closely connected to several academic programs, such as Game and Digital Media Design and programs focusing on art, writing, marketing, graphic or website design, science, and strategy.

Diversity
NEC has been publicly recognized by Time magazine as one of the top 25 colleges in the nation which have diversified their student body the most since 1990. The college strengthened its diversity efforts by establishing an Office of Diversity and Inclusion (ODI). The ODI holds annual events that observe minority communities such as African American, Hispanic/Latino, Asian, Native American & LGBTQ students."

Notable speakers and series
During the 2016 United States presidential primary election, New England College hosted town hall meetings for many invited candidates such as former Secretary of State Hillary Clinton, Donald Trump, New Jersey Governor Chris Christie, Senator Marco Rubio, Senator Ted Cruz, and Senator Bernie Sanders.

Every year the President's Speaker Series brings to campus prominent leaders and innovators from business, nonprofits, public policy, and issue-areas for students and members of the NEC and Henniker communities. Among these speakers are former White House Chief of Staff Andrew Card, author and business leader Larry Weber, former CEO of Priceline Jeff Boyd, New Hampshire state senator Sylvia Larsen, former Ohio Governor John Kasich, and New Hampshire’-based inventor and engineer Dean Kamen.

Athletics

New England College's Pilgrims compete in 19 intercollegiate NCAA Division III athletic sports, including soccer, lacrosse, ice hockey, field hockey, softball, baseball, basketball, cross-country, wrestling, volleyball, rugby, and alpine skiing. The Pilgrims compete in the New England Collegiate Conference (NECC). They were previously members of the North Atlantic Conference (NAC) from 2011 to 2018 and the Commonwealth Coast Conference (CCC) from 1989 to 2011.

Club sports

Accomplishments

Baseball 
 2018–19 NECC Conference Champions

Basketball 
Men's
 2017–18 NAC Conference Champions
 2019-20 NECC Conference Champions
Women's
 1992–93 CCC Conference Champions
 2018–19 NECC Conference Champions
 2019-20 NECC Conference champions

Cross country 
Men's
 2012 NAC Conference Champions
 2021 NECC Conference Champions

Women's
 2013–14 NAC Conference Champions

Field Hockey 
 1997–98 CCC Conference Champions
 1999–00 CCC Conference Champions
 2000–01 CCC Conference Champions
 2002–03 CCC Conference Champions
 2003–04 CCC Conference Champions
 2004–05 CCC Conference Champions
 2005–06 CCC Conference Champions
 2006–07 CCC Conference Champions
 2007–08 CCC Conference Champions
 2008–09 CCC Conference Champions

Ice Hockey 
Men's
 2000–01 NEHC Conference Champions
 2004–05 NEHC Conference Champions

Lacrosse 
Men's
 1997–98 CCC Conference Champions
 1998–99 CCC Conference Champions
 1999–00 CCC Conference Champions
 2004–05 CCC Conference Champions
 2011–12 NAC Conference Champions
 2013–14 NAC Conference Champions
 2015–16 NAC Conference Champions
 2016–17 NAC Conference Champions
 2017–18 NAC Conference Champions
 2018–19 NECC Conference Champions
 2018–19 NAC Conference Champions
Women's
 2000–01 CCC Conference Champions
 2003–04 CCC Conference Champions
 2018–19 NECC Conference Champions

Rugby 
Men's
 1981 Founded by Jay Gardner
 1984 Lyndon State Snowbowl Winner
 1985 Joined New England Collegiate Rugby Union
 1985 New England Collegiate Championships at Harvard University | First Ever For New England
 1987 10-1 Record
 1999 NERFU Championships 1st Place Finish - Co-Champions
 2000 NERFU Championships 1st Place Finish
 2013 NSCRO 7's Third Place Finish
 2013 NSCRO National Champions Cup 15s Third Place Finish
 2014 NSCRO 7's National Champions 
 2014 NSCRO National Champions Cup 15s Runner-up
 2015 NSCRO 7's National Championships Runner-up
 2015 NSCRO National Champions Cup 15s Champions
 2016 USA Rugby College 7s D1AA National Championships | 11th Place Finish
 2017 Las Vegas Invitational 7s Men's College D1 CRC Qualifier Division | Pool Winners | Quarterfinalists, Cup Consolation
 2018 ECRC Presidents Shield Champions
 2022 NERFU Halloween Weekend Series Champions
Soccer

Men's

 1989 CCC Conference Championship
 2016 NAC Conference Championship
 2021 NECC Conference Championship

Notable alumni
Geena Davis (b. 1956), Academy Award-winning actress who attended her freshman year at NEC before transferring to Boston University
Ira Joe Fisher (b. 1947), meteorologist and former weather reporter for The Saturday Early Show
Mariela Griffor (b. 1961), poet and diplomat
Siad Haji (b. 1999), professional soccer player for San Jose Earthquakes of MLS who attended his freshman year at NEC before transferring to Virginia Commonwealth University
Laura Harris Hales, writer, historian, and podcaster
Mark Lindquist (b. 1949), sculptor
Maureen Mooney, N.H. State Representative, attorney, and educator
Allen Steele (b. 1958), science fiction author
Wallace Stickney (1934–2019), director of the Federal Emergency Management Agency (FEMA) under President George H. W. Bush
Steven Zirnkilton (b. 1958), voice actor, narrator, radio show host, and politician

References

External links

Official website

 
Private universities and colleges in New Hampshire
Educational institutions established in 1946
Universities and colleges in Merrimack County, New Hampshire
1946 establishments in New Hampshire
Liberal arts colleges in New Hampshire
Henniker, New Hampshire
New England Hockey Conference teams